Guy Le Borgne (6 January 1920 – 12 December 2007) was a French Army general that fought in World War II, First Indochina War and Algerian War.  He commanded several paratroop units during his career and was military governor of Lyon.

Biography 
He graduated from Saint-Cyr Military Academy as part of the 1939-1940 "Franco-British Friendship" promotion.  After the Allied defeat in the Battle of France, he escaped to North Africa and made his way to Great Britain to join General de Gaulle's Free French Forces.

Became part of a Jedburgh team, a three men team consisting of an American, British and a Frenchman. Le Borgne's team no. 45, code named FRANCIS, was dropped over Finistère, Brittany in July 1944, to assist the French Resistance.  His British teammate, Major Colin Ogden Smith, was killed in a firefight with German troops on 29 July 1944.  After the Jedburgh mission he joined one of two French Special Air Service units with which he took part in two operations behind German lines in the Ardennes and the Netherlands.

After the war, he joined a parachute regiment and served in Indochina where he commanded the 8th Parachute Commando Group between 1952 and 1953. During the Algerian War he commanded the 3rd Marine Infantry Parachute Regiment from 1961 to 1962, leading it during the Bizerte crisis and keeping it loyal to de Gaulle during the 1961 Algiers Putsch. After the war Guy Le Borgne commanded the 11th Parachute Division from 1973 to 1975 and finished his career as military governor of Lyon from 1976 to 1980 with the grade of général de corps d'armée.

After he retired he was elected president of the Confédération nationale des associations parachutistes in 1980 and becoming member of the honorary committee of the Union Nationale des Parachutistes in 1988. Guy Le Borgne also painted under the pseudonyme of Guy Le Zachmeur, his resistance alias from World War II. He died on 12 December 2007.

Decorations 
 Grand Officer of the Légion d'honneur
 Grand Cross of the Ordre national du Mérite
 Croix de guerre 1939-1945
 Médaille de la Résistance
 Military Cross (UK)

1920 births
2007 deaths
Military personnel from Rennes
French generals
French military personnel of World War II
French military personnel of the First Indochina War
French military personnel of the Algerian War
20th-century French painters
20th-century French male artists
French male painters
21st-century French painters
21st-century French male artists
Official Painter of the French Air Force
École Spéciale Militaire de Saint-Cyr alumni
Grand Officiers of the Légion d'honneur
Grand Cross of the Ordre national du Mérite
Recipients of the Croix de Guerre 1939–1945 (France)
Recipients of the Resistance Medal